The 2015 FIBA Asia Under-16 Championship was the qualifying tournament for FIBA Asia at the 2016 FIBA Under-17 World Championship. The tournament was supposed to be held in Bangalore, India from July 2 to 12, but according to FIBA's official tournament website, it is scheduled to be played in Jakarta, Indonesia from October 29 to November 7.

South Korea defeated Chinese Taipei in the Finals, 78–69 to capture their first FIBA Asia Under-16 Championship after finishing second in the first two installments of the competition. Three-time defending champions China on the other hand managed to capture bronze against Japan, 80–58. The top three teams will represent FIBA Asia in the 2016 FIBA Under-17 World Championship in Spain.

Qualification 

Aside from the hosts and defending champion, each FIBA Asia subzone gets two berths each, except for the Central and South Asian zones that shall get one berth each. Rounding out the 16-team tournament are four berths that would be added to each subzone, depending on its teams' performance n the 2013 championship.

Defending champion (1):

Host country (1):

East Asia (5):

 *

Persian Gulf (2):

South Asia (1):

Southeast Asia (3):

West Asia (2):

 * Withdrew. 

For the Central Asia slot, India was selected to take its place, thus completing the 16-team field. However, North Korea reportedly withdrew a day before the beginning of the tournament, bringing down the number of participating nations to 15.

Draw 
The draw took place on 8 October 2015 in Jakarta, Indonesia.

 * Withdrew.

Preliminary round
All times are local (UTC+7).

Group A

Group B

Group C

Group D

Second round

Group E

Group F

Classification round

Classification 13th–15th

13–15th place semifinals

13th place game

Classification 9th–12th

9–12th place semifinals

Eleventh place game

Ninth place game

Final round

Bracket

Quarterfinals

5–8th place semifinals

Semifinals

Seventh place game

Fifth place game

Third place game

Final

Final standing

Awards

References 

FIBA Asia Under-16 Championship
2015–16 in Asian basketball
2015–16 in Indonesian basketball
International basketball competitions hosted by Indonesia